The 1970 Virginia Cavaliers football team represented the University of Virginia during the 1970 NCAA University Division football season. The Cavaliers were led by sixth-year head coach George Blackburn and played their home games at Scott Stadium in Charlottesville, Virginia. They competed as members of the Atlantic Coast Conference, finishing in last. At the conclusion of the season, Blackburn was fired as head coach. He had a record of 28–33–0 at Virginia, with just one winning season, in 1968.

Schedule

References

Virginia
Virginia Cavaliers football seasons
Virginia Cavaliers football